Thudaca is a moth genus of the family Depressariidae.

Species
 Thudaca calliphrontis Meyrick, 1893
 Thudaca campylota Meyrick, 1893
 Thudaca circumdatella (Walker, 1864)
 Thudaca crypsidesma Meyrick, 1893
 Thudaca cymatistis Meyrick, 1893
 Thudaca haplonota Meyrick, 1893
 Thudaca heterastis Meyrick, 1893
 Thudaca mimodora Meyrick, 1893
 Thudaca monolechria Turner, 1947
 Thudaca obliquella Walker, 1864
 Thudaca ophiosema Meyrick, 1893
 Thudaca orthodroma Meyrick, 1893
 Thudaca stadiaula Meyrick, 1893
 Thudaca trabeata Meyrick, 1893

References

 
Hypertrophinae